The Intel i486DX2, rumored as 80486DX2 (later renamed IntelDX2) is a CPU produced by Intel that was first introduced in 1992. The i486DX2 was nearly identical to the i486DX, but it had additional clock multiplier circuitry. It was the first chip to use clock doubling, whereby the processor runs two internal logic clock cycles per external bus cycle. An i486 DX2 was thus significantly faster than an i486 DX at the same bus speed thanks to the 8K on-chip cache shadowing the slower clocked external bus.

The i486DX2-66 was a very popular processor for video games enthusiasts in the early to mid-90s. Often coupled with 4 to 8 MB of RAM and a VLB video card, this CPU was capable of playing virtually every game title available for years after its release, right up to the end of the MS-DOS game era, making it a "sweet spot" in terms of CPU performance and longevity. The introduction of 3D graphics spelled the end of the 486's reign, because of their heavy use of floating point calculations and the need for faster cache and more memory bandwidth. Developers began to target the P5 Pentium processor family almost exclusively with x86 assembly language optimizations which led to the usage of terms such as Pentium compatible processor for software requirements. An i486DX2-50 version was also available, but because the bus speed was 25 MHz rather than 33 MHz, this was a significantly less popular processor.

There are two major versions of the DX2 - Identified by P24 and P24D, the latter has a faster L1 cache mode, called "write-back", that improves performance. The original P24 version offered only the slower "write-through" cache mode. AMD and Cyrix both produced a competitor for the Intel i486DX2.

See also

Intel DX4

External links

Intel Datasheets
 Embedded i486DX2

DX2

de:Intel i486#i486DX2